Samuel Johnson Howard (born ) is the eighth and current bishop of the Diocese of Florida in the U.S. Episcopal Church. Howard was elected bishop coadjutor on May 16, 2003, and entered office on January 29, 2004. He intends to retire in late 2023.

Early career
Howard was born on September 8, 1951, and is a North Carolina native. He is a 1973 graduate of Williams College in Williamstown, Massachusetts, and has been married to his wife, Martha Marie, since 1974. They have two grown sons, Augustus and Charles.

Howard graduated from the Wake Forest University School of Law in Winston-Salem, North Carolina, in 1976. He practiced law in Raleigh, North Carolina, from 1976 to 1986. He also worked on the staff of the Commerce Committee of the United States Senate.

Religious career
Howard radically changed his career by returning to school and graduating from Virginia Theological Seminary in Alexandria, Virginia, with a Master of Divinity degree. He was ordained as a deacon in June 1989 and a year later was ordained as a priest. His first position was assistant to the rector of the Church of the Holy Comforter in Charlotte, North Carolina, then rector of St. James' Episcopal Church in Charleston, South Carolina.

Howard served as vicar of Trinity Church Wall Street from December 1997 until going to Florida in 2003.

See also

 List of Episcopal bishops of the United States
 Historical list of the Episcopal bishops of the United States

References

External links
Episcopal Diocese of Florida website
St. John's Cathedral website

1951 births
Living people
American Episcopalians
American Episcopal priests
People from North Carolina
Williams College alumni
Wake Forest University School of Law alumni
Virginia Theological Seminary alumni
Episcopal bishops of Florida